Sugar Girl is a 1964 children novel written by Nigerian author Kola Onadipe.

Plot 
Ralia is the daughter of a blind woman and a man with a broken back who goes missing in the forest while arranging firewood and is taken in by an old witch who offers her accomdation in return for Ralia’s singing voice.

Fews days later Ralia runs away from the witch house. She is taken in by a hunter and his family which Ralia befriends the hunter daughter.
One day while playing together, She is knocked down by a prince  who takes her his home to nurse her.

After recovering Ralia is taken back home to her village where she reunites with her parents.

Reception 
The book was well received and is used in Nigerian primary schools.

References 

1964 Nigerian novels
Novels set in Nigeria
Children's books